The canton of Aubenton is a former administrative division in northern France. It was disbanded following the French canton reorganisation which came into effect in March 2015. It consisted of 13 communes, which joined the canton of Hirson in 2015. It had 3,299 inhabitants (2012).

The canton comprised the following communes:

Any-Martin-Rieux
Aubenton
Beaumé
Besmont
Coingt
Iviers
Jeantes
Landouzy-la-Ville
Leuze
Logny-lès-Aubenton
Martigny
Mont-Saint-Jean
Saint-Clément

Demographics

See also
Cantons of the Aisne department

References

Former cantons of Aisne
2015 disestablishments in France
States and territories disestablished in 2015